Fiorenza Sanudo (died after 1397) was lady of the island of Milos in Frankish Greece.

She was a daughter of Marco Sanudo, Lord of Milos.

She married in 1383 Francesco I Crispo, who became the tenth Duke of the Archipelago, and had issue.

References
Ancestry of Sultana Nur-Banu (Cecilia Venier-Baffo)

People from the Duchy of the Archipelago
Fiorenza 01
People from Milos
14th-century Venetian people
Year of birth unknown
Year of death unknown
14th-century women rulers
14th-century Italian women
14th-century Greek people
14th-century Greek women
Duchesses of the Archipelago